The Norway women's national football team represents Norway in international association football. It is fielded by the Norwegian Football Federation, NFF, the governing body of football in Norway, and competes as a member of the Union of European Football Associations (UEFA), which encompasses the countries of Europe. Norway competed for the first time on 7 July 1978, in a match the team lost 1–2 against Sweden.

Norway has competed in numerous competitions, and all players who have played between 55 or more matches, either as a member of the starting eleven or as a substitute, are listed below. Each player's details include her usual playing position while with the team, the number of caps earned and goals scored in all international matches, and details of the first and most recent matches played in. The names are initially ordered by number of caps (in descending order), then by date of debut, then by alphabetical order. All statistics are correct up to 8 November 2019.

Key

Players

This list is under construction.

See also
Norway women's national football team

References 

Norway
 
Association football player non-biographical articles